Üsküdar American Academy (Turkish: Üsküdar Amerikan Lisesi) is a private coeducational high school located in Üsküdar borough of Istanbul, Turkey.

The school was established by the American Board of Commissioners for Foreign Missions in 1876. Today, it is owned and administered by the Health and Education Foundation (Sağlık ve Eğitim Vakfı, or SEV) along with other former ABCFM institutions in Turkey.

History
American Academy for Girls was founded in 1876 in Bahçecik, a town in the city of Kocaeli by the Congregational missionaries of the American Board of Commissioners for Foreign Missions. The school was moved to Adapazarı where it remained until World War I..

ACG vacated the Baglarbaşı site in 1914 and moved to Arnavutköy, a neighborhood on the European side of Bosphorus, leaving the Baglarbaşı campus empty from 1914 to 1921 except for the years 1914–1915 when the buildings of the school were used as an orphanage by the Americans and the years 1915–1918 when the Turkish army used the school as a barracks.

When Üsküdar American Academy for Girls was looking for a new location in Istanbul, it moved to the present site in Baglarbaşı in the early 1920s. With its new site and in the spirit of the new Republic of Turkey, the school became dedicated to quality education for girls. In 1925, the education at the school was being done in the basement of Barton Hall and in Bowker Hall. The Round House was in the same place as it is today. There was a wooden black building in the place of Emir Konak. There was a chapel in the place of the present gymnasium in which Sunday worship services were held for the local Christian community. During the week it was an assembly hall and classes were held in the basement. There was originally a stable on the site where Kinney Cottage stands today. The school's need for milk was met by the cows that lived in the stable. The stable was later demolished and the Practice House (Kinney Cottage) was built as a homemaking skills practicing center for the seniors. The building was named Kinney Cottage in memory of Mary Kinney who was the principal of the school when it moved from Adapazarı.

Üsküdar American Academy experienced a radical change in 1990 when it admitted boys for the first time into the Orta Prep class. With this change, "American Academy for Girls" became part of history and the school became known as "Üsküdar American Academy". With the help of USAID grants, the Sabancı Holding, supportive parents, and the Health and Education Foundation (SEV) physical changes have also continued with the building of a gymnasium, the restoration of Bowker and Barton Halls, and the construction of Morgan Hall, the science, math and computer building. Today the school, like its sister schools American Collegiate Institute in Izmir, Tarsus American College in Tarsus, SEV American College in Istanbul, as well as the American Hospital in Gaziantep, is under the governance of the Health and Education Foundation (SEV), which carries full responsibility and authority for operating the school.

The current campus of Üsküdar American Academy is situated on a hill in a residential district of Üsküdar. The campus falls in the officially recognized neighborhood (mahalle) of Selamiali (Selamsız), but the school lists its address as Bağlarbaşı neighborhood.

Campus and curriculum
The Uskudar American Academy Library is located on the ground floor of Martin Hall.

Established in 1876, Üsküdar American Academy is one of the oldest schools in the region. Today the school is governed by a Turkish non-profit trust, The Health and Education Foundation and it provides an English language, college preparatory program of studies to Turkish students.

Uskudar American Academy is accredited as an international school, offering a blend of Turkish and American educational systems.

Situated on a hill in the residential district of Üsküdar, the school campus includes 8 buildings sited on 18,000 square meters.

See also 

 American Collegiate Institute in İzmir
 Koç School 
 Robert College
 List of high schools in Turkey
 Education in the Ottoman Empire

References

External links
UAA Web Site
UAA Alumni Website

Educational institutions established in 1876
High schools in Istanbul
American international schools in Turkey
Üsküdar
1876 establishments in the Ottoman Empire
International Baccalaureate schools in Turkey